Iliana Malinova Iotova (born 24 October 1964) is a Bulgarian politician who has been serving as Vice President of Bulgaria since 2017. She was the running mate of Rumen Radev, who defeated GERB nominee Tsetska Tsacheva in the second round of the 2016 presidential election. She was a Member of the European Parliament from 2007 until her resignation on 16 January 2017. She speaks Bulgarian, French and English.

Education
Born in Sofia, Iotova studied in the Lycée Français de Sofia. She received a master's degree in Bulgarian and French philology from the University of Sofia and later specialized at the École nationale d'administration (ENA, National School of Administration) in Strasbourg, France, and the Center for European Studies (CEES) of the University of Strasbourg.

Early career
From 1990 to 1997, Iotova worked  at Bulgarian National Television as a reporter, editor, director and presenter of news and current affairs programmes. She then worked as the director of the press service of the Bulgarian Socialist Party.

Political career

Career in national politics
In the 2005 national elections, Iotova was elected to the National Assembly.

Member of the European Parliament, 2007–2017
Iotova became a Member of the European Parliament in 2007 and was re-elected in 2014. There she was part of the Progressive Alliance of Socialists and Democrats group.

In parliament, Iotova served on the Committee on the Internal Market and Consumer Protection (2007-2009), the Committee on Fisheries (2009-2014) and the Committee on Petitions (2009-2014). From 2012 until 2013, she was also a member of the Special Committee on Organised Crime, Corruption and Money Laundering. From the 2014 elections, she served as vice-chairwoman of the Committee on Civil Liberties, Justice and Home Affairs, under the leadership of chairman Claude Moraes. In this capacity, she was her parliamentary group's rapporteur on a 2015 report calling for the equitable distribution of 40,000 refugees across the European Union.

In addition to her committee assignments, Iotova served as chairwoman of the parliament's delegation to the EU-Montenegro Stabilisation and Association Parliamentary Committee and as member of the delegation to the Parliamentary Assembly of the Mediterranean. She was also a member of the European Parliament Intergroup on Integrity (Transparency, Anti-Corruption and Organized Crime).

Ahead of Bulgaria's 2016 presidential elections, Iotova was officially nominated as the Bulgarian Socialist Party's running mate for presidential candidate Rumen Radev. After her election to the Vice Presidency, she resigned her MEP seat.

References

External links
 
 

Living people
1964 births
Politicians from Sofia
Members of the National Assembly (Bulgaria)
MEPs for Bulgaria 2007–2009
MEPs for Bulgaria 2009–2014
MEPs for Bulgaria 2014–2019
Women MEPs for Bulgaria
Coalition for Bulgaria MEPs
Bulgarian Socialist Party politicians
Bulgarian journalists
Bulgarian women journalists
Bulgarian television presenters
Sofia University alumni
École nationale d'administration alumni
Vice presidents of Bulgaria
Women vice presidents
Bulgarian women television presenters
21st-century Bulgarian women politicians
21st-century Bulgarian politicians